(born 1891-died 1956) was the Interim Mayor of Hiroshima from August 7 to October 22, 1945. 

Morishita served as vice mayor of Hiroshima under mayor Senkichi Awaya prior to the atomic destruction of his city. He was appointed acting mayor following the death of the previous mayor Senkichi Awaya in the atomic attack on Hiroshima. He remained acting mayor for a brief period, until Shichirō Kihara was nominated mayor of Hiroshima.

Further reading

Notes

Mayors of Hiroshima
1891 births
year of death unknown